Sceloporus lineatulus, the Santa Catalina spiny lizard, is a species of lizard in the family Phrynosomatidae. It is endemic to Isla Santa Catalina in Mexico.

References

Sceloporus
Endemic reptiles of Mexico
Reptiles described in 1919
Taxa named by Mary Cynthia Dickerson
Fauna of Gulf of California islands
Endemic fauna of the Baja California Peninsula